Leontina is female variant of the name Leo or Leon. Notable people with the surname include: 

 Leontina Albina Espinoza (b. 1925 - d. 1998), woman from Chile
 Leontina Vaduva (b. 1960), Romanian soprano
 Leontina Vukomanović (b. 1970), female singer from Serbia

See also 
 844 Leontina, a Trojan asteroid

Feminine given names